Casandria is a monotypic moth genus of the family Noctuidae. Its only species, Casandria emittens, is found in Jamaica. Both the genus and the species were first described by Francis Walker in 1857.

References

Catocalinae
Monotypic moth genera